Saint-Génard is a former commune in the Deux-Sèvres department in western France. On 1 January 2019, it was merged into the new commune Marcillé. The 20th-century French archaeologist Pierre de La Coste-Messelière (1894–1975) was born in Saint-Génard.

See also
Communes of the Deux-Sèvres department

References

Former communes of Deux-Sèvres